Gliophorus perplexus is a species of agaric fungus in the family Hygrophoraceae. It was first described in 1954 by American mycologists Alexander H. Smith and Lexemuel Ray Hesler as Hygrophorus perplexus.

References

External links

Hygrophoraceae
Fungi described in 1954
Fungi of North America
Taxa named by Alexander H. Smith